The Seventh Amendment of the Constitution (Election of Members of Seanad Éireann by Institutions of Higher Education) Act 1979 is an amendment to the Constitution of Ireland that provides that the procedure for the election of six members of the Senate in the university constituencies could be altered by law. It was approved by referendum on 5 July 1979 and signed into law on 3 August of the same year.

Background
In the new Seanad created by the Constitution adopted in 1937, six seats were elected by universities: three by the National University and three by Dublin University (or Trinity College Dublin). The government in 1979 proposed splitting up the National University of Ireland (NUI) and creating separate universities in Cork, Dublin, and Galway. It was concerned that the outline of seats in the Constitution could act as a bar to this proposal, or that the new proposed universities would lose any representation. The constitutional amendment allowed a redistribution of the six university seats between these universities and any other institutions of higher education in the State. It also ensured that the section could not be invoked to prohibit the dissolution of either of the named universities.

Changes to the text
Alterations to Article 18.4 (new text is in bold):

Oireachtas debate
The Seventh amendment was introduced by Minister for Education John Wilson for the Fianna Fáil government.
He described the purpose of the bill as:

It was not opposed by the opposition parties Fine Gael and the Labour Party and the Bill passed final stages in the Dáil on 23 May. It passed all stages in the Seanad on 31 May and proceeded to a referendum on 5 July.

Result
The referendum was held on the same day as the Sixth Amendment, which dealt with the validity of certain child adoption orders, and was approved on a low turnout by 552,600 (92.4%) votes in favour to 45,484 (7.6%) against.

Note: For this referendum and the Sixth Amendment held on the same day, the constituencies used were each county and county borough (city), which were deemed under section 2 of the Referendum (Amendment) Act 1979 to be constituencies for the purpose of the poll. Usually in Irish referendums the Dáil Éireann general election constituencies are used.

Consequential changes
, no change has been made to the distribution or electorate of the six university seats.  The NUI was not disbanded, although the Universities Act 1997 upgraded its "constituent colleges" to "constituent universities". Other institutes of higher education have increased in number and status, with the NIHEs and DIT of 1979 gaining university status in 1989 and 2019 respectively; graduation from none of them confers a vote in Seanad elections.

The Fine Gael–Labour government returned after the 2011 election proposed to abolish the Seanad in its entirety. After the proposal was rejected by referendum in 2013, the government agreed instead to consider reforming the Seanad. In February 2014, it published a draft Seanad Electoral (University Members) (Amendment) Bill, which would create a single six-seat constituency in which anyone with a degree-level qualification from a recognised institution would be eligible to vote. In 2015, the Working Group on Seanad Reform appointed by the government issued its report (the "Manning report"), which endorsed the 2014 bill but also recommended that 30 of the 43 Vocational panel senators should be directly elected, and that university graduate voters would have to choose between voting in the university constituency or one of the five panel constituencies.

The Fine Gael-led government returned after the 2016 election made implementing the 2015 report a priority. Simon Coveney, answering a Dáil question in July 2016 as Minister for Housing, Planning, Community and Local Government, said implementation of the 1979 amendment would be "further considered in the context of [the 2015 report] … and having regard to the work of the last government on [the 2014 draft bill]. In February 2018, Taoiseach Leo Varadkar proposed to establish an Oireachtas special committee to meet for eight months and "develop specific proposals to legislate" implementation of the 2015 report; he added, "The university panels should be retained as recommended. They have served us well, although they should be reformed to implement the result of the 1979 referendum and open up the franchise to graduates of all higher level institutions of education."

In the 2020 general election, the manifestos of Sinn Féin and the Green Party promised to implement the Manning report. The resulting Fianna Fáil–Fine Gael–Green coalition endorsed Seanad reform but prioritised the creation of an Electoral Commission. Fianna Fáil senators introduced a private member's bill, the Seanad Electoral (University Members) (Amendment) Bill 2020, which would create a single university constituency encompassing "All Universities in the State, and Institutions of Higher Education in the State as provided for by the Minister ", with the franchise extended to holders of degrees or diplomas accredited by Quality and Qualifications Ireland. The second stage debate was adjourned in November 2020 at the request of Malcolm Noonan, the Minister of State for electoral reform, who suggested that gaps in the bill's provisions could best be filled in by waiting for the Electoral Commission due by the end of 2021.

See also
Politics of the Republic of Ireland
History of the Republic of Ireland
University constituency
1979 Irish constitutional referendums
Amendments to the Constitution of Ireland

References

External links
Seventh Amendment of the Constitution (Election of Members of Seanad Éireann by Institutions of Higher Education) Act 1979
Full text of the Constitution of Ireland

1979 in Irish law
1979 in Irish politics
1979 referendums
07
07
University constituencies in the Republic of Ireland
Suffrage referendums
July 1979 events in Europe
Amendment, 07
Amendment, 07
Electoral reform referendums